Saaxo is a district on the Somali city and border 67 km west of Galkacyo.

References 

Populated places in Mudug